Erol Iba (born in Jayapura, Irian Jaya, 6 August 1979) is a retired Indonesian professional footballer. He normally plays as a defender or can be a midfielder and his height is 170 cm. Best known for his speed in the left wing, he is also noted for his good dribbling, passing and aggressiveness. He is currently the assistant coach of the Persipura Jayapura.

Club career 
Starting his football career in  Papua Training and Education Center, Erol moved to Ragunan Training and Education Center in 1997. There he spent one year, before joining with football club from West Sumatera which played in Indonesian League, Semen Padang, in 1998.
In this club, where he spent four years, Erol was remarked as one of the most talented Indonesian wing backs.  The young star took his club as top ten club in the competition in 2000, and in 2001 he took Semen Padang to the semifinal phase of Indonesian league.
His abilities soon attracted many clubs to sign him. In 2002, he signed a one-year contract with PSPS Pekanbaru, a club that was forming a dream team by signing many of Indonesian’s famous players such as Kurniawan Dwi Yulianto and Bima Sakti. However, he failed to repeat his good performance in Semen Padang as well as the club failed to be the top flight in the league.
Despite his poor performance, Erol was signed by Benny Dollo, currently the coach of Indonesian football team, who was at that time, the coach of Arema Malang, in which Erol spent three years from 2003–2006.

In this club Erol proved his talent by taking the club to become the champion of Copa Indonesia in both 2005 and 2006.
Later on he joined Persik Kediri after the departure of Benny Dollo from Arema Malang. In 2007 Erol signed a deal with Pelita Jaya joining Fandi Ahmad, the ex–Singapore most famous striker, who is coaching for the club.
His form attracted attention from current A-League side Sydney FC.

After 11 years playing in several clubs outside Papua, Erol, in 2009, return to his hometown playing for Persipura Jayapura, the 2 times Champion of Indonesian Super League. He said that this was every Papua player’s dream to be in the Persipura Jayapura Squad. His success in Indonesia League breaks a negative thought saying that Papuan players often fail when they are playing for another clubs outside Papua.

More interest came from A-League sides, this time Newcastle Jets, and Erol was linked with the Australian Side.

In January 2015, he signed with Persepam Madura United.

International career 
He has played for the Indonesia national football team. His first International debut in a senior national team squad was on 23 August 2006 at the 2006 Merdeka Tournament. There he played for Indonesia  against Malaysia, where the teams tied 1-1. At Asian Cup 2007 he just played one time as a substitution player when Indonesia lost 0-1 to South Korea in the last game in group D.

National team career:
 2001: Pre Asian Cup (selection), SEA Games XI Kuala Lumpur(U-23)
 2006: Brunei Merdeka Games, BV International Cup
 2007: AFF Championship, Asian Cup

Achievements 
 2 times winning Piala Indonesia (2005, 2006) with Arema Malang
 4th Places at Sea Games XI Kuala Lumpur (2001) with U-23 National Team after loss 0-1 to Myanmar U-23 National Team (3rd Places)
Runner-up Brunei Merdeka Games 2006 after being beaten 1-2 by Myanmar

References

External links 
 
 

1979 births
Papuan people
Living people
Indonesian footballers
Indonesian football managers
Indonesia international footballers
Indonesia youth international footballers
Liga 1 (Indonesia) players
Indonesian Premier Division players
2007 AFC Asian Cup players
People from Jayapura
Semen Padang F.C. players
PSPS Pekanbaru players
Arema F.C. players
Persik Kediri players
Pelita Jaya FC players
Persipura Jayapura players
Persebaya Surabaya players
Persegres Gresik players
Gresik United players
Sriwijaya F.C. players
Persepam Madura Utama players
Association football fullbacks
Association football wingers
Sportspeople from Papua